The rufous-browed hemispingus (Poospiza rufosuperciliaris) is a species of bird in the family Thraupidae. It is endemic to Peru. Its natural habitat is subtropical or tropical moist montane forests.
It is threatened by habitat loss.

References

Birds described in 1974
Endemic birds of Peru
rufosuperciliaris
Taxonomy articles created by Polbot